Snowden v. Hughes, 321 U.S. 1 (1944), was a United States Supreme Court case in which the Court held that the Fourteenth Amendment to the United States Constitution does not protect rights pertinent solely to state citizenship, and that the equal protection clause does not protect citizens from unfair applications of fair state laws where purposeful discrimination is absent.

References

External links

United States Supreme Court cases
United States Supreme Court cases of the Stone Court
1944 in United States case law
United States Fourteenth Amendment case law